Félix López or Felix Lopez may refer to:

Félix López (anarchist) (1904–?), Chilean anarchist
Félix López, first municipal president of Tepehuanes independent municipality in 1917
Felix Lopez (businessman) (born 1954), Cuban-born American sports executive